Meira Kumar (born 31 March 1945) is an Indian politician and former diplomat. A member of the Indian National Congress, she was the Minister of Social Justice and Empowerment from 2004 to 2009, the Minister of Water Resources for a brief period in 2009. She served as the 15th Speaker of Lok Sabha from 2009 to 2014, being the first woman to hold the post. Kumar became just the second woman to be nominated for president of India by a major political block when she secured the United Progressive Alliance's nomination in 2017.

Prior to being a member of the 15th Lok Sabha, Kumar had been elected earlier to the 8th, 11th, 12th and 14th Lok Sabha. Kumar was the joint presidential candidate by the leading opposition parties for 2017 presidential election and lost the election to the NDA nominee Ram Nath Kovind. Meira Kumar's vote share is the third highest for a losing candidate, that of Neelam Sanjiva Reddy in the 1969 Presidential elections and K. Subba Rao in 1967 Presidential elections.

Early life
Meira Kumar was born on 31 March 1945, in Bhojpur district, Bihar of the British India (present day Bihar, India) to  Jagjivan Ram, an Oppressed leader and former Deputy Prime Minister and Indrani Devi, a prominent leader of the Indian freedom struggle. Growing up, Kumar shared a close relationship with her mother, who she spent most of her time with. She discussed the impact that her mother had on her in an interview with Manoj Tibrewal of the Doordarshan News, calling her the biggest influence from her childhood.

Kumar attended the Welham Girls School, Dehradun and Maharani Gayatri Devi Girls' Public School in Jaipur. She studied at Banasthali Vidyapith for a short duration. She completed her Master's degree and Bachelors of Law from Indraprastha College and the Faculty of Law, University of Delhi respectively. She also received an honorary doctorate from Banasthali Vidyapith in 2010.

Kumar worked as a social worker during her youth, actively participating in movements supporting social reforms, human rights, and democratic ideas. She was appointed as the Chairperson of National Drought Relief Committee constituted by the Congress during 1967 famine in region of Bihar. As the head of the commission, Kumar launched a Family Adoption Scheme under which drought-affected families were provided support from volunteering households.

Career

Foreign Service
Kumar joined the Indian Foreign Service in 1973 and was posted as language trainee at the Embassy of India Spain. During this period, she obtained a diploma in Spanish. Later, she was posted at the High Commission of India,United Kingdom . After working as a diplomat for a decade, Kumar quit the Indian Foreign Services in 1985 and decided to enter politics after being encouraged by her father and the then Prime Minister of India, Rajiv Gandhi.

Political career

Kumar entered electoral politics in 1985, when she received an Indian National Congress' nomination for the Lok Sabha from the Bijnor constituency bye-poll in Uttar Pradesh. She defeated, as a newcomer, two veteran dalit leaders including Ram Vilas Paswan of the Janata Dal and Mayawati of the Bahujan Samajwadi Party. Following her election to the Lok Sabha, Kumar was appointed as member of the Ministry of External Affairs' Consultative Committee in 1986.

Meera Kumar lost elections for 9th Lok Sabha (1989) and 10th Lok Sabha from Sasaram, but went on to win elections for the 11th (in 1996) and the 12th Lok Sabhas from Karol Bagh in Delhi. She lost her seat to the candidate from the Bhartiya Janata Party in 1999 election, but was able re-elected with a significant majority from her father's former constituency of Sasaram in Bihar in 2004 and 2009. In the 2014 general election and in 2019, Kumar contested from Sasaram and lost both times to her nemesis Chhedi Paswan who has defeated her in Sasaram four times.

Following the Congress party's win in the 2004 Indian general elections, Kumar served in the United Progressive Alliance's Government as the Minister of Social Justice and Empowerment from 2004 to 2009, under the premiership of Manmohan Singh.

In 2009, the United Progressive Alliance returned to power after an improved performance in the general election and Kumar was, on May 22, 2009, briefly inducted as member of the centre's cabinet as the Minister for Water Resources.

However, she was later nominated for the position of the Speaker of Lok Sabha and she submitted her resignation three days after assuming ministerial office. Kumar was then elected as the first ever woman speaker of Lok Sabha and remained in office from 2009 to 2014.

2017 presidential election

Kumar secured the United Progressive Alliance's nomination for the 2017 Indian presidential election, becoming just the third woman to be nominated for president of India by a major political bloc, after Pratibha Patil. Although she received support from most of the major opposition parties for her election to the office, she went on to lose to the National Democratic Alliance nominee Ram Nath Kovind.

Kovind received a total of 2,930 votes (which included both Members of Parliament and Members of the Legislative Assemblies) amounting to electoral college votes of 702,044. He defeated Kumar, who received a total of 1,844 votes amounting to 367,314 votes in terms of electoral college.

National Legislators' Conference
 In September 2022, Meira Kumar was appointed as a key patron of NLC Bharat.

Positions held 
Meira Kumar has been elected 5 times as Lok Sabha MP.

Explanatory notes

See also
Navtej Sarna
Taranjit Singh Sandhu
Harsh Vardhan Shringla
List of politicians from Bihar

References

External links

 Meira Kumar Biography Govt. of India Portal
 Kamal Nath gives clean chit to Lok Sabha Speaker Meira Kumar in bungalow controversy

|-

|-

|-

|-

|-

1945 births
Living people
20th-century Indian lawyers
20th-century Indian women politicians
20th-century Indian politicians
21st-century Indian lawyers
21st-century Indian women politicians
21st-century Indian politicians
India MPs 1984–1989
India MPs 1996–1997
India MPs 1998–1999
India MPs 2004–2009
India MPs 2009–2014
Candidates for President of India
Dalit politicians
Dalit women
English-language writers from India
Indian Foreign Service officers
Indian National Congress politicians from Bihar
Indraprastha College for Women alumni
Lok Sabha members from Bihar
Lok Sabha members from Delhi
Lok Sabha members from Uttar Pradesh
People from Bhojpur district, India
People from Central Delhi district
People from Sasaram
Speakers of the Lok Sabha
United Progressive Alliance candidates in the 2014 Indian general election
Indian Hindus
Delhi University alumni
Women members of the Cabinet of India
Women in Bihar politics
People from Bijnor district
Welham Girls' School alumni
Bihari politicians
20th-century Indian women lawyers
21st-century Indian women lawyers
Women members of the Lok Sabha